Moreilândia is a city  in the state of Pernambuco, Brazil.

Geography

 State - Pernambuco
 Region - Sertão Pernambucano
 Boundaries - Ceará state   (N);  Granito  (S);  Exu  (W);  Serrita   (E)
 Area - 
 Elevation - 502 m
 Hydrography - Brigida river
 Vegetation - Subperenifólia forest.
 Climate - semi-arid- hot and dry
 Annual average temperature - 24.7 °C
 Distance to Recife - 577 km

Economy

The main economic activities in Moreilândia are based on agribusiness, especially livestock (e.g. cattle, sheep, pigs and goats raising);  and crops such as corn and beans.

Economic Indicators

Economy by Sector
2006

Health Indicators

References

Municipalities in Pernambuco